Libertarias (English: Libertarians) is a Spanish historical drama made in 1996.  It was written and directed by Vicente Aranda.

In 1936, Maria (Ariadna Gil), a young nun is recruited by Pilar (Ana Belén), a militant feminist, into an anarchist militia following the onset of the Spanish Civil War.  Guided by the older woman, Maria is exposed to the realities of war and revolution, and comes to question her former, sheltered life.

Plot summary
The movie is set in 1936 in Barcelona in the midst of the Spanish Revolution and Spanish Civil War. Militia women Pilar (Ana Belén) and Floren (Victoria Abril) are joined by former prostitute Charo (Loles León) and former nun Maria (Ariadna Gil), who had hidden in a brothel to escape revolutionary violence against clergy. The film opens with scenes of working class militants demolishing and burning religious icons, as they shout "down with Capitalism!" and "long live the libertarian revolution!"

While fully immersed in the overall enthusiasm of revolutionary Spain, Pilar and friends find themselves fighting against deep gender inequality which complicates their efforts in the war against Francisco Franco's Nationalist/Fascist/Catholic forces. They encounter resistance even within their own "Free Women" (Mujeres Libres) organization as one woman (that resembles Federica Montseny) tries to persuade them to stay and work in defense factories, while men try to convince them to go work as cooks, not front-line soldiers.

Cast and characters
 María (Ariadna Gil) is a young, sheltered woman, Maria is swept into the confusion and euphoria of the initial days of the Spanish Civil War, when her convent is overrun by anarchist militiamen.  Fearing for her life, as she believes the men mean her harm, she seeks refuge amongst the back alleys of the city, only to be given shelter in a brothel.  Minutes later, the same building is stormed by militia-women, and the stern faced Pilar.  When the brothel is closed, Maria is left with nowhere to go.  Fearing for her safety, she stays by Pilar's side, hoping the stronger woman can shield her from the realities of a war, and a social revolution, she does not understand.  Overtime she comes to sympathize with the anarchists who she has joined, blending her own beliefs of heaven and paradise with an anarchist desire for a communal society founded on liberation.  Though she never picks up a rifle for their cause, she ultimately becomes strong enough for a final reversal of roles, as she gives shelter to Pilar in the final moments of the movie.
 Pilar (Ana Belén) is a confident anarcha-feminist, Mujeres Libres member, and militia soldier, Pilar is a constant source of strength for the characters around her, and a protector of the naive María.  After convincing the prostitutes of a brothel to turn their backs on their old lives and become militia soldiers, she takes Maria under her wing, fearing the shy girl will only be in danger as a Catholic in a newly anti-theistic anarchist society.  Disguising the girl as a fellow anarchist, she takes Maria as a ward and leads a small troop of militia soldiers into battle against the forces of Franco.
 Victoria Abril as Floren
 Blanca Apilánez as Aura
 Laura Mañá as Concha
 Loles León as Charo
 Jorge Sanz as Obrero Hijo
 José Sancho as Obrero padre
 Joan Crosas as Boina
 Antonio Dechent as Faneca

Reception
Time Out stated that the movie "deserves praise for its feminist perspective on the course of the 1936-7 revolution, when women's liberation was a logical, if hardly well-recognised, constituent of the libertarian ideals that the Spanish working class rose up to assert."

See also
 Anarchism in Spain
 Anarcha-feminism
 Militant anti-fascism
 Mujeres Libres

References

External links
 
 
  New Internationalist article
  Universidad del Sagrado Corazón summary
  Locarno International Film Festival synopsis

1996 films
Films about anarchism
Spanish drama films
1990s Spanish-language films
Anarcha-feminism
Spanish Civil War films
Films directed by Vicente Aranda
Anarchism in Spain
Spanish Revolution of 1936
1990s Spanish films